Andrzej Nowak may refer to:

 Andrzej Nowak (civil engineer), professor in civil engineering at Auburn University
 Andrzej Nowak (psychologist) (born 1953), Polish psychologist and professor
 Andrzej Nowak (ice hockey) (1956–2013), Polish ice hockey player
 Andrzej Nowak (historian) (born 1960), Polish historian and professor at Jagiellonian University
 Andrzej Nowak (musician) (born 1959), Polish guitar player with TSA